The Commander Tom Show was a children's television series that aired weekday afternoons on Channel 7 WKBW-TV in Buffalo, New York, premiering on December 20, 1965.

The host of the show was Tom Jolls, who had joined WKBW as a weatherman earlier in 1965. When the show launched, it consisted of interstitial segments with Jolls shown around episodes of the Adventures of Superman, a TV series that ran from 1952 till 1958. Dustmop the puppet (a dog) was introduced in 1967. An alligator puppet, Matty the Mod followed, along with the first female puppet Cecily Fripple, modeled after the American comedian Phyllis Diller. A similar appearing puppet was Cecily's evil sister Cecile.

In the early 1970s, Superman (whose rights had moved to the networks) would be replaced with other family and children's programming including re-runs of The Three Stooges, The Flintstones, Batman, Little Rascals, The Munsters, and The Addams Family. Many short animated cartoons also were shown: Warner Bros. Merrie Melodies and Looney Tunes were staples for many years, including some of the earliest Porky Pig and Bugs Bunny shorts from the 1930s. Hanna-Barbera cartoons such as Touché Turtle and Peter Potamus replaced Bugs and his friends after a time. A number of MGM cartoons from the 1930s were shown as well. Near the end of its run, the show was renamed Commander Tom's World and relegated to weekends. In later years, it played such shows as Davey and Goliath, Rainbow Brite, and The Getalong Gang.

After the show was cancelled in 1991, the "Commander Tom" character was merged into another show, a revival of Rocketship 7 in 1992. That, too, came to an end in 1993, and the character of "Commander Tom" had gone for good.

Tom would often travel from school to school to speak to young children.  He was an annual event in the Holland Central School district's "Let's Give America a Chance" career day.

References

1960s American children's television series
1970s American children's television series
1980s American children's television series
1990s American children's television series
Local children's television programming in the United States
American television shows featuring puppetry
1965 American television series debuts
1991 American television series endings